BanG Dream! is a Japanese music media franchise owned by Bushiroad that includes an anime television series. The anime currently has three seasons.

The first season was produced by Issen and Xebec, while the main production staff included director Atsushi Ōtsuki and composer Yuniko Ayana. The season follows the creation of the band Poppin'Party by first-year high school student Kasumi Toyama, who wishes to find a heart-pounding sound known as the "Star Beat" that she felt as a child. Spanning 13 episodes, it aired from January 21 to April 22, 2017 on Tokyo MX, and was streamed by Anime Network and Crunchyroll. An original video animation episode was released on November 22, 2017 on the seventh Blu-Ray/DVD volume.

A second season developed by Sanzigen aired from January 3 to March 28, 2019. Also 13 episodes long, it continues Poppin'Party's story as the band members enter their second year of high school, while also focusing on fellow all-girl bands Afterglow, Pastel Palettes, Roselia, and Hello, Happy World!. Kōdai Kakimoto replaced Ōtsuki as director for the second season, while the rest of the cast reprised their roles.

Sanzigen returned to produce the series' third season, which follows the BanG Dream! Girls Band Challenge and the growth of Raise A Suilen. It was originally scheduled for October 2019, but it was delayed to January 2020. The third season aired from January 23 to April 23, 2020, though the first episode was released on January 7 as it was bundled with a limited-edition Blu-ray release with the season's theme music.

The main series features eight pieces of theme music. Season 1 respectively uses "Tokimeki Experience!" and "Sparkling Dreaming: Sing Girls", both by Poppin'Party, as the opening and ending themes. The second season's themes are performed by Poppin'Party and Roselia: the former's "Kizuna Music" and the latter's "Brave Jewel" are used as openings, while "Jumpin'" and "Safe and Sound" are the endings. Poppin'Party performs Season 3's opening "Initial" and ending "Straight Through Our Dreams!", for the final episode, the ending was a collaboration between Poppin'Party, Roselia, and Raise A Suilen.

In 2018, two chibi spin-off series titled Pastel Life and BanG Dream! Girls Band Party! Pico began broadcast in May and July, respectively; both are three-minute shorts, with the former following Pastel Palettes and the latter covering every band. For its theme song, Pastel Life subject group plays "Shuwarin Dreaming". A second season to Pico titled BanG Dream! Girls Band Party! Pico: Ohmori aired from May to October 2020. BanG Dream! Girls Band Party! Pico Fever! aired from October 2021.

Various movies have also been produced by Sanzigen. BanG Dream! Film Live, directed by Tomomi Umezu and written by Kō Nakamura, premiered on September 13, 2019. A sequel, Film Live 2nd Stage, came out August 20, 2021. Story-driven films include the two-part Episode of Roselia series released on April 23 and June 25, 2021, and Poppin'Dream! on January 1, 2022.

In 2022, to celebrate the fifth anniversary of the BanG Dream! Girls Band Party! mobile game, Sanzigen released a two-part series titled BanG Dream! Girls Band Party! 5th Anniversary Animation: CiRCLE Thanks Party!. Later in the year, a Morfonica-focused series called Morfonication was released online on July 28 and 29.

Series overview

Episode list

Season 1

Season 2

Season 3

Other series

Pastel Life

CiRCLE Thanks Party!

Morfonication

Films

Notes

References

E
BanG Dream